The 2022–2025 ICC Women's Championship is the third edition of the ICC Women's Championship, a Women's One Day International cricket (WODI) competition that is being contested by ten teams, to determine qualification for the 2025 Women's Cricket World Cup. The top five teams, along with the yet to be announced host nation, will qualify directly for the World Cup. The bottom four teams and the top two teams from the WODI rankings will progress to a Women's Cricket World Cup Qualifier tournament. Each team will play a total of eight three-match series, with four of them played at home, and four played away.

Australia are the two-time defending champions, having won the 2014–2016 ICC Women's Championship and the 2017–2020 ICC Women's Championship. England, India, New Zealand, Pakistan, South Africa, Sri Lanka and the West Indies also competed in the first two editions of the Women's Championship.

In September 2018, the International Cricket Council (ICC) announced that they were exploring the option to expand the Women's Championship from eight teams to ten teams, therefore including Bangladesh and Ireland in future editions of the competition. When the 2021 Women's Cricket World Cup Qualifier was called off midway through due to the discovery of a new variant of COVID-19 in Southern Africa, Bangladesh and Ireland joined the ICC Women's Championship for this cycle, based on their WODI rankings.

In March 2022, Cricket Ireland was the first cricket board to confirm fixtures for the 2022–2025 ICC Women's Championship, when they announced Ireland's home series against South Africa for June 2022. Later in March 2022, the Pakistan Cricket Board (PCB) confirmed three series, with two of those at home, against Sri Lanka and Ireland, and a tour to Australia. Pakistan's home series against Sri Lanka was the first series of the 2022–2025 ICC Women's Championship.

Teams
The following teams are competing in the Women's Championship:

Schedule
The ICC announced the following home and away schedule for each team:

Points table

Fixtures

2022

Pakistan v Sri Lanka

Ireland v South Africa

Sri Lanka v India

England v India

2022–23

West Indies v New Zealand

Pakistan v Ireland

West Indies v England

New Zealand v Bangladesh

Australia v Pakistan

References

External links
 Series home at ESPN Cricinfo

ICC Women's Championship
International cricket competitions in 2022
International cricket competitions in 2022–23